Po mojoj bašti zumbuli cvjetaju (In My Garden Hyacinths Bloom) is the debut release and first gramophone record by Bosnian folk singer Beba Selimović. It was released in 1958 through the label Jugoton.

Background
In January 1954, when Selimović was 14 years of age, she was one of six people chosen out of 300 candidates to sing for Radio Sarajevo, which kicked off her professional career as a soloist for the station.

Track listing

Personnel

Instruments
Jovica Petković – accordion
Ratomir Petković – accordion

References

1958 albums
Beba Selimović albums
Jugoton albums